Gavin Mannion (born August 24, 1991) is an American former cyclist, who competed as a professional from 2011 to 2022.

Major results

2009
 3rd Bermuda GP
2011
 6th La Côte Picarde
2012
 1st Stage 1 Tour of New Baunfels
 3rd Road race, National Under-23 Road Championships
2013
 6th Overall Tour of the Gila
 8th Overall Tour de l'Avenir
2015
 2nd Overall Redlands Bicycle Classic
 3rd Overall Tour of the Gila
 3rd Overall Cascade Cycling Classic
 4th Overall USA Pro Cycling Challenge
2016
 7th Overall Tour de Korea
2017
 2nd Overall Tour of Utah
 2nd Overall Cascade Cycling Classic
 3rd Overall Joe Martin Stage Race
 4th Overall Tour of the Gila
2018
 1st  Overall Colorado Classic
1st Stage 2 (ITT)
 2nd Overall Tour of the Gila
1st Stage 5
 4th Road race, National Road Championships
2019
 8th Overall GP Beiras e Serra da Estrela
2020
 5th Overall Tour de Savoie Mont-Blanc
1st Stages 4 & 5 (ITT)
 8th Overall Troféu Joaquim Agostinho
 9th Overall Vuelta a San Juan
 10th Overall Settimana Internazionale di Coppi e Bartali
2021
 6th Trofeo Andratx – Mirador d'Es Colomer

References

External links

1991 births
Living people
American male cyclists
Sportspeople from Dedham, Massachusetts
Cyclists from Massachusetts